Mangalagiri is a constituency in Guntur district of Andhra Pradesh, representing the state legislative assembly in India. As per the Delimitation Orders (2008), the constituency covers the mandals of Tadepalle, Mangalagiri and Duggirala. It is one of the seven assembly segments of Guntur Lok Sabha constituency, along with Tadikonda, Ponnur, Tenali, Prathipadu, Guntur West, and Guntur East. Alla Ramakrishna Reddy is the current MLA of the constituency, who won the 2019 Andhra Pradesh Legislative Assembly election from YSR Congress Party. As of 2019, there are a total of 268,429 electors in the constituency.

Mandals 
The constituency comprises three mandals.

Members of Legislative Assembly Mangalagiri

Members of Legislative Assembly Duggirala

Members of Legislative Council

Municipal Chairperson in Mangalagiri Municipality

Municipal Chairperson in Tadepalli Municipality

ZPTC's in Managalagiri Constituency

MPP's in Managalagiri Constituency

Election results

Assembly elections 2019

Assembly elections 2014

Assembly elections 2009

Assembly Elections 2004

Assembly elections 1999

Assembly elections 1994

Assembly elections 1989

Assembly elections 1985

Assembly elections 1983

Assembly elections 1978

Assembly elections 1972

Assembly elections 1967

Assembly elections 1962

Assembly elections 1955

Assembly elections 1952

Duggirala Election results

2004

1999

1994

1989

1985

1983

1978

1972

1967

1962

1956

1955

1952

See also 
 List of constituencies of the Andhra Pradesh Legislative Assembly
 Guntur district

References 

Assembly constituencies of Andhra Pradesh
Guntur district